Petit Gulf cotton was a cotton hybrid patented by planter Rush Nutt at his Laurel Hill Plantation in Rodney, Mississippi, in 1833. It was named "Petit Gulf" for the bend of the Mississippi River where it was grown. It proved more resistant than the green seed cotton from Georgia as long as planters followed the breeding process used in Rodney. Indeed, it was said to be less likely to harbor diseases and rot than other breeds of cotton. Moreover, it was easier to pick with a human hand, thus leading to greater productivity.

An eponymous song appears on Justin Townes Earle's 2010 album ''Harlem River Blues.

References

Cotton
Jefferson County, Mississippi